The following is a partial list, by year, of notable incidents or reports of international adoption scandals, adoption corruption, child harvesting, baby-stealing, legal violations in international adoption, or adoption agency corruption (see child laundering; child trafficking): "In the United States international adoptions are a big business, where many private international adoption agencies are paid on average $30,000 a time to find a child for hopeful parents."

2020
The United States Department of Justice in August 2020 charged three women in Ohio for their alleged roles in "schemes to corruptly and fraudulently procure adoptions of Ugandan and Polish children through bribing Ugandan officials and defrauding U.S. adoptive parents, U.S. authorities, and a Polish regulatory authority."

2019 
The then-serving assessor of Maricopa County, Arizona, Paul D. Petersen, was accused of running an illegal adoption scheme where he recruited, transported, and offered payment to dozens of pregnant women from the Marshall Islands to give their babies up for adoption in the United States over three years. An agreement between the two countries banned adoptions between the US and the Marshall Islands.

2017
Ethiopia indefinitely suspended, and later banned, all adoptions to the United States.

2010 
United States and Russia - Russia temporally suspended all child adoptions by U.S. families after a 7-year-old Artyom Savelyev (Justin Hansen) adopted by a Tennessee nurse Torry Hansen was sent alone on a one-way flight back to Moscow with a note saying he was "mentally unstable". After this incident, Russian Children's Ombudsman Pavel Astakhov said, "We must, as much as possible, keep our children in our country". The Chairwoman of the Russian parliamentary committee on family and children, Yelena Mizulina,  pointed out that 30,000 children were sent back to institutions by their Russian adoptive, foster or guardianship families in the last three years.
United States and Russia - Russian officials called for a suspension of adoptions to U.S. parents after a Pennsylvania couple were charged with beating to death their adoptive child from Russia. 
New Life Children’s Refuge case. In the aftermath of the 2010 Haiti earthquake, ten Baptist missionaries were arrested and charged with kidnapping. The group had gathered 33 children in devastated areas and intended to move them to a temporary orphanage in the Dominican Republic. The missionaries did not have proper authorization to take the children out of Haiti. It later became clear that most of the children were not orphaned. “33 Haitian children, most of whom were not orphans and had families.” this is most accurate way to convey that this was clearly an opportunistic act by Silsby through her cover, a questionable group, known as the New Life Children's Refuge. 33 abducted children but NLCR did not have proper authorization for transporting the children. They were arrested on kidnapping charges.

2009
China - "Six government officials in southwest China have been punished over an orphanage scandal when three children were taken away from their families who could not afford fines for violating family planning regulations. The orphanage sent the children overseas for adoption from 2004 to 2006, a Guizhou-based newspaper reported today."
Samoa - Four Sentenced in Scheme, prosecutors say adoption agency tricked Samoan parents into giving their children up for adoption
Ethiopia - Canadian Broadcasting Company reports Canadian families "claim that CAFAC has informed them their child is an orphan when the parents exist... (and) that sometimes the children's ages are wildly off and the health of these kids varies greatly from what they have been told before travelling to Addis Ababa to pick them up." Andrew Geoghegan reports, "At least 70 adoption agencies have set up business in Ethiopia. Almost half are unregistered, but there’s scant regulation anyway and fraud and deception are rife. Some agencies actively recruit children in a process known as harvesting. This had prompted on Dutch agency to stop adoptions from Ethiopia "as a result of recent reports about abuse of the system by the government in Ethiopia and local adoption agencies. Research done by the adoption agency shows that the information about the children on file does not match their background. In several cases, the mothers of the children were still alive while being listed as deceased."
Vietnam - "A court in northern Vietnam has put 16 people on trial for allegedly selling more than 250 babies for foreign adoption. The head of two social welfare centres in Nam Dinh province as well as several doctors and nurses at village clinics went on trial yesterday," said Dang Viet Hung, the chief judge at the court hearing the case. The defendants are charged with "abuse of power and authority" and could face prison terms of five to 10 years."

2007
Guatemala - Guatemalan police, soldiers and government officials raid a foster home in Antigua taking custody of 46 babies, accusing the home of failing to issue the proper paperwork for adoptions.
Haiti - 47 children, victims of child trafficking are returned by IOM and the Pan American Development Foundation (PADF) to their homes in Grand'Anse of south-west Haiti.

2005
China - In November 2005, Xinhua News reported that orphanages in China's Hunan Province, as well as other unnamed orphanages in Guangdong and Guangxi Provinces, were caught buying babies from traffickers for "800 yuan (US$98.89) to 1,200 yuan and resold them to other orphanages or families at a much higher price."  Follow-up investigations showed that over 1,000 babies were sold to the Hunan orphanages by the Duan family, and that these children were almost all adopted internationally. 
Samoa - Samoa rushes through legislation "to tighten up on foreign adoptions following the death of a child who had been in the care of an American agency..." one year after "a One News investigation revealed Samoan parents had put their children up for adoption with the organisation Focus On Children, not realising they would never see them again. Parents thought the children would stay in America only for their education and that the adoption was not permanent."

2004
Samoa -  One News reveals Samoan parents put their children up for adoption with the organisation Focus On Children thinking the children would stay in America only for their education and that the adoption was not permanent and reveals that they would likely never see their children again.

2003
UNICEF releases report on child trafficking/child laundering in Africa.
England - Judge attacks social worker over international adoption scandal. "The lid was lifted on the "evil and exploitative" business of international adoption yesterday when a High Court judge attacked a British freelance social worker for allowing a blacklisted family to buy a baby from a couple in the United States...But before her first birthday she was placed at the mercy of the courts after her "new" parents, who were barred from adoption in Britain by conventional means, split and her adoptive mother committed suicide."

2001
In December 2001, U.S. Immigration and Naturalization Service halts adoptions from Cambodia.  Richard Cross, the lead investigator for the US Immigration and Customs Enforcement, “accused officials at the highest level of government of complicity of scams involving hundreds of babies and millions of dollars.” He was also "the lead federal investigator for the prosecution of Lauryn Galindo for visa fraud and money laundering involved in Cambodian adoptions, estimated that most of the 800 adoptions Galindo facilitated were fraudulent--either based on fraudulent paperwork, coerced/induced/recruited relinquishments, babies bought, identities of the children switched, etc." This followed investigations by a local human rights group and the Phnom Penh Post exposing baby-buying and abduction through Lauryn Galindo's adoption operations, as well as others. In 2004, Galindo pleaded guilty to federal charges and was sentenced to 18 months in prison and also ordered to forfeit more than $1.4 million in property in Hawaii.
A scandal featuring the 'purchase' of American twin girls Kiara and Keyara Wecker, first by an American couple and later by a Welsh couple, as depicted in Three Mothers, Two Babies and a Scandal

2000
The United Nations issues Protocol to Prevent, Suppress and Punish Trafficking in Persons, especially Women and Children, supplementing Convention against Transnational Organized Crime.

1999
India - Andhra Pradesh - "[T]he scandal broke in March and April of 1999, and once again involved Sanjeeva Rao and his orphanage, ASD. This time, another individual, Peter Subbaiah, who ran the Good Samaritan Evangelical and Social Welfare Association, was also implicated. The primary accusation concerned buying babies from a tribal group called the Lambada. The Lambada were a traditionally nomadic people, now settled into hamlets (called tandas) and surviving primarily through subsistence farming and farm labor, often under severe poverty. The Lambada had previously practiced the custom of a bride price but had adopted the culturally predominant Indian dowry system, which requires the bride's family to pay a substantial sum to the groom’s family to arrange her marriage. In addition, the Lambada was said to believe that the third, sixth, and ninth child was, if a girl, “inauspicious.” They were allegedly prone both to female infanticide and also to selling, for very modest sums, some of their female infants. Press accounts in India referred to their “fair complexion” as making them more attractive to foreign parents, although it is not clear whether this reflected Indian, rather than American, prejudices. The 1999 scandals began with the arrest of two women who were alleged to be acting as scouts or intermediaries in the purchase of children. Although some reports styled these women as “social workers,” they were charged with buying Lambada infants for relatively small sums ($15 to $45) and then receiving significantly larger sums ($220 to $440) from the orphanages for the children. Press reports indicated that the orphanages received $2000 to $3000 for each child placed in inter-country adoption. As a result of the 1999 scandals, Sanjeeva Rao and Peter Subbaiah were arrested and put in prison."

1995-1996
India - "The Andhra Pradesh adoption scandals focused on suspicions of irregularities in an orphanage called Action for Social Development. Children whose adoptions had been held up by the American embassy were granted visas and allowed to travel to the United States.

1994
Romania - Law review article reports the U.S. embassy investigating Romanian adoptions discovered “incidents where Romanian mothers believed that they were merely ‘loaning’ their children to foreign parents and not relinquishing them permanently”.
Other countries - Law review article reports "baby trafficking" problems in Peru, Brazil, Paraguay, Colombia, Honduras, Sri Lanka (see child trafficking/child laundering.)

1970-2017 
During the period 1970 to 2017, 11,000 babies from Sri Lanka had been exported to Western Countries, mainly to Europe. The Netherlands, Sweden, Switzerland and Germany were the countries where many babies had been given up for adoption from it. The Netherlands were in the front with over 4000 babies. Due to poverty and many social and cultural problems, Sri Lankan families had to give up their babies for adoption. Adoption agencies and some notable people had been identified as intermediaries in the adoption process. As the demand was high, many Adoption agencies and intermediates started Baby farms, where they created babies. Many hospitals in Sri Lanka in districts such as Ratnapura District, Galle District, Kandy District, Colombo District, Kegalle District and Kalutara District, were involved in the adoption process as they stole babies from mothers or they direct many mothers towards adoption. Many doctors, nurses, midwives, tourist guides, government officials, and lawyers have been the main performers in this scandal, where they have earned a bulk of money. The babies had been bought for around $30 from mothers by intermediates. And sold to foreign couples at a doubled amount by intermediaries. After the year 2000, many babies who had been given away went to Sri Lanka to see their biological parents so at there they found that the documents used in adoption are false and the biological parents are also not the real ones. In 2017, after Zembla (TV series), a Dutch Current affairs program, revealed the truth of the incidents happened at that time after both the Dutch Government and the Sri Lankan Government took on necessary investigations where the Sri Lankan Government accepted that the baby farms were present in that period. Many adoptees have gone in front of the Court to ask for an investigation into their adoption.

1869-1970s 
The Home Children scheme which exported more than 100,000 children from the UK to Australia, Canada, New Zealand and South Africa. Many were used to fill labour shortages, but a minority were adopted. The scandal was uncovered by social worker Margaret Humphreys and brought to wider public attention with the film Oranges and Sunshine.

References 

Children's rights
Human trafficking
Lists of controversies
Scandals
Parenting-related lists